Josef Brötzner (born 5 March 1945) is an Austrian former wrestler who competed in the 1972 Summer Olympics.

References

External links
 

1945 births
Living people
Olympic wrestlers of Austria
Wrestlers at the 1972 Summer Olympics
Austrian male sport wrestlers